Drum Beat is a 1954 American CinemaScope Western film in WarnerColor written and directed by Delmer Daves and co-produced by Daves and Alan Ladd in his first film for his Jaguar Productions company. Ladd stars along with Audrey Dalton, Charles Bronson as Captain Jack, and Hayden Rorke as President Ulysses S. Grant.

Filmed in Sedona, Arizona, the story uses elements of the 1873 Modoc War in its narrative, with Ladd playing a white man asked by the U.S. Army to attempt negotiations with Native Modocs who are about to wage war.

An early role for Charles Bronson (originally Buchinsky), who plays Captain Jack as a memorable villain wearing the coat of a deceased US Cavalry Captain. Prior to murdering General Edward Canby (Warner Anderson) during a peace negotiation, Bronson's character puts on a General's coat and announces to the audience "Me GENERAL Jack now!"

Plot
In 1872, veteran Indian fighter Johnny MacKay (Alan Ladd) is sent for by then President Grant (Hayden Rorke). He tells government officials in Washington about hostilities between settlers, soldiers and Modoc renegades near the California and Oregon border. He is appointed peace commissioner for the territory.

On the way west, Johnny gives an escort to Nancy Meek (Audrey Dalton), a retired army colonel's niece. Nancy is traveling to a ranch owned by her aunt and uncle. There is an ambush outside Sacramento during which the sweetheart of their stage driver Bill Satterwhite is killed by a Modoc renegade. Later they find Nancy's aunt and uncle murdered and the ranch burned.

The grown children of an old Modoc chief, Toby (Marisa Pavan) and Manok (Anthony Caruso), meet Johnny at Fort Klamath. They tell Johnny it is a chief who calls himself Captain Jack (Charles Bronson) and a band of renegades who are responsible for the brutality while most of the other Modoc wish to live in peace. They both served as intermediaries for the Modoc.

Toby and Manok take Johnny and others to a peace talks near Lost River to discuss violations of the peace treaty signed by the Modoc in 1864 in hopes of bringing about peace again. When the violations are being discussed between Johnny and Captain Jack a vengeance crazed Satterwhite (Robert Keith) opens fire and kills the brave who killed his woman. A rampage results in which the renegades massacre 18 settlers. The Army responds but is unable to dislodge the renegade Modoc from their mountain stronghold and are forced to retreat with several casualties. After hearing of the massacre and the Army defeat President Grant orders General Canby's to act as a defensive force only.

Once more peace talks were arranged but Toby and Manok warn of treachery. General Canby (Warner Anderson), Dr. Thomas (Richard Gaines), a Modoc sympathizer, Johnny and friend Mr. Dyar (Frank Ferguson) are to come unarmed but Johnny and Mr. Dyar come armed with revolvers hidden under their shirts. During the negotiations Captain Jack pulls a hidden revolver and kills the General as other Modoc pull theirs and start firing. Dr. Thomas is also killed. Johnny is shot but only wounded and unconscious and is about to be scalped when Toby tries to shield him from harm and is killed. Mr. Dyar escapes in a hail of bullets. The Army responds causing Captain Jack and the other Modoc to retreat back to their stronghold before Johnny can be killed.

President Grant is forced to act because of the public outcry and orders Johnny to do whatever is necessary to bring Captain Jack to justice. The renegades are eventually dislodged from their stronghold and are forced to split up into separate groups. Soon most of the Modoc surrender leaving Captain Jack to survive on his own. He and Johnny have a shootout and hand-to-hand combat. Johnny prevails and places him under arrest. Captain Jack is jailed, put on trial and sentenced to hang. Afterwards Johnny returns to the woman he has fallen in love with, Nancy.

Cast

 Alan Ladd as Johnny MacKay
 Audrey Dalton as Nancy Meek
 Marisa Pavan as Toby
 Charles Bronson as Kintpuash / Captain Jack
 Strother Martin as Scotty
 Rodolfo Acosta as Scarface Charley
 Warner Anderson as General Edward Canby
 Willis Bouchey as General Gilliam (based on Jefferson C. Davis)
 Anthony Caruso as Manok
 Peggy Converse as First Lady Julia Grant
 Elisha Cook Jr. as Blaine Crackel
 Richard H. Cutting as Colonel Meek
 Michael Daves as Young Boddy (as Mike Lawrence)
 Frank DeKova as Jim "Modoc Jim"
 Frank Ferguson as Mr. Dyar
 Richard Gaines as Rev. Dr. Eleazar Thomas
 Peter Hansen as Lieutenant Goodsall
 Isabel Jewell as Lily White
 Robert Keith as Bill Satterwhite
 Pat Lawless as O'Brien
 George J. Lewis as Captain Alonzo Clark (as George Lewis)
 Perry Lopez as Bogus Charley
 Hayden Rorke as President Ulysses S. Grant
 Edgar Stehli as Jesse Root Grant
 Rico Alaniz as Medicine Man (uncredited)
 Rayford Barnes as Captain Summer (uncredited)
 Frank Gerstle as Grant's Officer (uncredited)
 James Griffith as Veteran One-Legged Soldier At White House Gate (uncredited)
 Richard Hale as General William Tecumseh Sherman (uncredited)
 Kay E. Kuter as Veteran Soldier (uncredited)
 George Lloyd as Settler (uncredited)
 Victor Millan as Indian (uncredited)
 Carol Nugent as Nellie Grant (uncredited)
 Leonard Penn as Miller, Settler (uncredited)
 Denver Pyle as Fairchild (uncredited)
 Arthur Space as Army Doctor (uncredited)
 Paul Wexler as William Boddy (uncredited)

Production
The film was announced in April 1954. It was the first production from Ladd's own company, Jaguar, which released through Warner Bros. He made it after a spell of almost two years making films outside the USA.

Delmer Daves wrote the script based on his family's first hand knowledge of the Modoc Indians on the California-Oregon border in the 1870s.
 
Marisa Pavan and Audrey Dalton were signed to three picture contracts with Jaguar. Dalton was borrowed from Paramount.

Reception
According to Kinematograph Weekly it was a "money maker" at the British box office in 1955.

Comic book adaptation
 Dell Four Color #610 (January 1955)

See also
List of American films of 1955

References

Notes
In the actual events of the Modoc war of 1873 Modoc Toby (Winema) Riddle doesn't die and saves the life of severely wounded Alfred B. Meacham who was an American Methodist minister, reformer, and served as the U.S. Superintendent of Indian Affairs for Oregon (1869–1872). At the time of the Peace Tent assassinations he was chairman of the Modoc Peace Commission. Toby (Winema) Riddle was one of the few Native American women to be honored by the US Congress authorizing a military pension for her because of her heroism and service. She lived until 1920.

Captain Jack was hanged for General Edward Canby's murder, along with three of his warriors. The rest of the tribe was either returned to the Klamath Reservation in Oregon or relocated to Oklahoma. Canby, by the way, was the only U.S. Army general killed in a war against the Indians. (George Armstrong Custer was, in fact, only a lieutenant colonel at the time of his 1876 death at Little Big Horn.)

Citations

External links
 
 
 
 

1954 Western (genre) films
1954 films
American Western (genre) films
Western (genre) cavalry films
Cultural depictions of Ulysses S. Grant
1950s English-language films
Films adapted into comics
Films directed by Delmer Daves
Films scored by Victor Young
Films set in 1872
Films set in California
Films set in Oregon
Warner Bros. films
CinemaScope films
1950s American films